The gens Octavena was an obscure plebeian family at Rome.  The gens is known primarily from a single individual, the jurist Octavenus, cited by a number of later authorities, although several other Octaveni are known from inscriptions.

Members
 Octavenus, a jurist, who probably lived in the mid-first century AD.  He is cited by a number of authorities, including Valens, Pomponius, Paulus, and Ulpian.
 Titus Octavenus Gratus, a freedman and manufacturer of roof tiles dating to AD 123, found at several towns in Italy.
 Quintus Octavenus Hymnus, named in an inscription from Hispania Citerior.
 Octavena Pia, named in an inscription from Ostia.
 Octavenus Pius, named in an inscription from Ostia.
 Caninia Octavena, buried at Cirta in Numidia, aged twenty-seven years, three months.

See also
 List of Roman gentes

References

Bibliography
 Digesta seu Pandectae (The Digest).
 Dictionary of Greek and Roman Biography and Mythology, William Smith, ed., Little, Brown and Company, Boston (1849).
 Theodor Mommsen et alii, Corpus Inscriptionum Latinarum (The Body of Latin Inscriptions, abbreviated CIL), Berlin-Brandenburgische Akademie der Wissenschaften (1853–present).
 Paul von Rohden, Elimar Klebs, & Hermann Dessau, Prosopographia Imperii Romani (The Prosopography of the Roman Empire, abbreviated PIR), Berlin (1898).
 Herbert Bloch, "Supplement to volume XV.1 of the Corpus Inscriptionum Latinarum", Harvard University Press (1948).

Roman gentes